The red-banded flowerpecker (Dicaeum eximium) is a species of bird in the family Dicaeidae.
It is endemic to the Bismarck Archipelago.

Its natural habitat is subtropical or tropical moist lowland forest.

References

Dicaeum
Birds of the Bismarck Archipelago
Birds described in 1877
Taxa named by Philip Sclater
Taxonomy articles created by Polbot